Coffee production in Democratic Republic of the Congo (DRC) is centered in the Lake Kivu provinces. There are about 11,000 coffee farmers in the country who produce two main varieties of coffee, Robusta and Arabica.

Farmers and co-ops
There were more than 11,000 coffee farmers in the DRC in 2013. Co-operative associations, such as Furaha, Muungano, and Sopacdi are valuable partners to the coffee farmers in sales and distribution.

Species
Many varieties of coffee are grown in the DRC but the two major species are Robusta, which is grown mainly in the northeast of the country such as in Isiro, and in the low lands of Ubangi, Uele, Kivu, Kasai, and Bas-Congo; and the lighter Arabica varieties which is grown at higher elevations in Kivu and Ituri. Arabica accounts for one fifth of the total production of coffee.

Production
By 1989, coffee exports were at a high of }, but they declined sharply in the 1994–2003 period, possibly due to the civil wars of 1997 and 1998. Coffee wilt disease also affected growth in some areas. In 2006, coffee production, in terms of  bags, was 100,000 bags of Arabica and 470,000 bags of Robusta.

In 2012, the government launched a programme for the recovery of the coffee sector titled Strategy Document for the Recovery of the Coffee Sector 2011–2015 and made a budgetary provision US$100 million for the purpose.

References

Bibliography

Democratic Republic of the Congo
Lake Kivu
Economy of the Democratic Republic of the Congo